Tom Priestley (born 22 April 1932 in London) is a British film and sound editor, whose career spans from 1961 to 1990.

Personal life
Tom Priestley is the only son of the novelist and playwright J. B. Priestley. He was educated at Bryanston School and King's College, Cambridge, where he read English.

Career
Upon leaving Cambridge, Priestley found employment at Shepperton Studios and worked in various roles including assistant sound editor. His break came when he worked as assistant editor on the now classic films Whistle Down the Wind and This Sporting Life. Bryan Forbes and Lindsay Anderson were so impressed by his ability to edit that he soon graduated to supervising editor and then full editor. His first complete edit was the John Krish directed science fiction movie Unearthly Stranger (1963). From the late sixties to the late eighties he was always in demand and was regarded as one of the world's leading film editors. He has worked on many prize winning films and with many leading directors and producers. These include Karel Reisz, Lindsay Anderson, John Boorman, Roman Polanski, Jack Clayton, James Scott and Blake Edwards. He won a BAFTA in 1967 for his work on Morgan – A Suitable Case for Treatment and was Academy Award-nominated in 1972 for Deliverance. When production of Roman Polanski's Tess (1979) became problematic, he was brought in to assist Alastair McIntyre and get the film completed. Priestley edited the 1982 film A Shocking Accident, directed by James Scott, which won the Oscar in 1983 for Best Live Action Short. 

Since 1990 Priestley has spent his time more in the world lecturing on film editing and handling the estate of his late father.  He is currently president of the J. B. Priestley Society and The Priestley Centre for the Arts in Bradford, West Yorkshire.

Filmography

Film Editing 
Morgan - A Suitable Case for Treatment (1966)
Marat/Sade (1966)
Isadora (1968)
Deliverance (1972)
The Great Gatsby (1974)
The Return of the Pink Panther (1975)
Voyage of the Damned (1976)
Jubilee (1977)
Exorcist II: The Heretic (1977)
Tess (1979)
A Shocking Accident (1982)
Another Time, Another Place (1983)
1984 (1984)
Nanou (1986)
White Mischief (1987)

Sound Editing 
 Nowhere to Go (1958)
 Dunkirk (1958)
 Left Right and Centre (1959)
 The Scapegoat (1959)
 This Other Eden (1959)
 The Angry Silence (1960)
 Repulsion (1965)
 Dr Who and the Daleks (1965)
 The Skull (1965)

References

External links
 

Living people
English film editors
British sound editors
1932 births
BAFTA winners (people)
Alumni of King's College, Cambridge